Eleonore Schönmaier is a Canadian poet and fiction writer.

Career 

Eleonore Schönmaier is the author of the critically acclaimed poetry collections Field Guide to the Lost Flower of Crete (2021), Dust Blown Side of the Journey (2017), Wavelengths of Your Song  (2013), and Treading Fast Rivers (1999). Wavelengths of Your Song has also been published in German translation as Wellenlängen deines Liedes (2020). Her award-winning poems have been published widely in literary magazines in Canada, Germany, the Netherlands, New Zealand, Bangladesh, the United Kingdom,  and the United States, including Grain, Arc Poetry Magazine, Prairie Fire, Event, Prairie Schooner, Stand and Magma. Her poetry was chosen for the Academy of American Poets Poem in Your Pocket Day booklet in 2018 and 2020 and for the League of Canadian Poets Poem in Your Pocket Day brochures in 2018, 2019, and 2020 and for Poetry in Motion 2019 (Nova Scotia). Her work is widely anthologized internationally, and her poem "Weightless" was published in Best Canadian Poetry.

Schönmaier has taught advanced fiction writing at St. Mary's University, creative writing at Mount St. Vincent University, and has worked as a writing mentor for the Writers' Federation of Nova Scotia.  She has won numerous awards, including the Alfred G. Bailey Prize, the  Earle Birney Prize, the National Broadsheet contest, and the  Sheldon Currie Fiction Award. American, Canadian, Scottish, Dutch and Greek composers have all written music based on Schönmaier's poetry including Michalis Paraskakis, Carmen Braden and Emily Doolittle. The New European Ensemble, and the St. Andrews New Music Ensemble have performed her poetry in concert.

Awards
Eyelands Book Awards, Poetry, Published Book Category, Finalist 2020
The Antigonish Review's Great Blue Heron Poetry Contest, Honourable Mention 2020
National Broadsheet Contest Winner 2019
Arc poem of the year shortlist 2015
Bridport Poetry Prize shortlist 2015
Winston Collins Descant Prize for Best Canadian poem, Finalist 2012
The Antigonish Review's Great Blue Heron Poetry Contest, Third Prize 2009
Alfred G. Bailey Award 2009
Earle Birney Prize 2008
Great Canadian Literary Hunt, This Magazine, Poetry Finalist, 2007 
Sheldon Currie Fiction Award, Second Prize, 2009
Gerald Lampert Memorial Award, Finalist Best First Book of Poetry, Canada, 2000

Works 
Treading Fast Rivers McGill-Queen's University Press (1999) 
Wavelengths of Your Song McGill-Queen's University Press (2013) 
Dust Blown Side of the Journey McGill-Queen's University Press (2017) 
Wellenlängen deines Liedes parasitenpresse (2020) German translation of Wavelengths of Your Song Translator Knut Birkholz 
Field Guide to the Lost Flower of Crete McGill-Queen's University Press (2021)

Reviews
Dust Blown Side of the Journey is the work of a poet who has mastered her craft...featuring a beautifully elaborate intertwining of images...connections continue from poem to poem...akin to recurring melodies or riffs across distinct movements of a composition...poems both captivating and moving.

 The fluidity within the poems [in Wavelengths of Your Song] is matched by the subtle flow between them.  The effect is like that of a symphony with interwoven and subtly varied musical statements, and, as in a symphony, the effect is cumulative.

 Wellenlängen deines Liedes ist ein großartiges Buch einer ebensolchen Autorin, die es kennenzulernen gilt.

References

External links 
Official Website
Field Guide to the Lost Flower of Crete description
Dust Blown Side of the Journey description
Wavelengths of Your Song description
Treading Fast Rivers description
Twelve or Twenty Questions
Writing as Motion: Eleonore Schönmaier
Migrations
What We Don't Think of Packing
Review of Wavelengths of Your Song in Arc Poetry Magazine
Review of Dust Blown Side of the Journey in The Malahat
Review of Dust Blown Side of the Journey in Canadian Literature
Review of Wellenlängen deines Liedes in Westdeutscher Rundfunk (West German Radio)
League of Canadian Poets interview with Eleonore Schönmaier
Live-Retrieved Memory: the poetry of Eleonore Schönmaier

Living people
20th-century Canadian poets
21st-century Canadian poets
Canadian women poets
20th-century Canadian women writers
21st-century Canadian women writers
Year of birth missing (living people)